Jess A. Cliffe (born June 27, 1981) is a video game designer who co-created the Half-Life mod Counter-Strike with Minh Le and started the Counter-Strike series. He is also the "voice of Counter-Strike" via the radio commands,  the voiceline "Counter-Terrorists Win!" and sound effects. He has worked on maps for Half-Life: Deathmatch.

Education
He attended Virginia Polytechnic Institute and State University from 1999 to 2003.

Career

Before getting involved with the original Counter-Strike, Jess Cliffe was a very active gaming website designer. The earliest known gaming website he founded was Jedi Knight Multiplayer Addon Group (JKMAG) which he founded in December 1997. After around a year of maintaining the website, he moved on to start the website Action Quake2 Map Depot. It was during the time he was involved with this site that he got to know Marcelo Dilay and Minh Le as Dilay and Le were part of the team developing Action Quake 2. Around January 1999, Cliffe also founded the website Silo X devoted to Half-Life maps.

After graduating Cliffe took a job with Valve, where he was employed as a game designer, 3D artist and level designer. However, he was suspended from Valve in early 2018 due to being arrested.

Legal history

Arrest for sexual exploitation, investigation
On February 2, 2018, at 1:17 a.m. PST, Cliffe was arrested on allegations of "sexual exploitation of a minor" in the Southwest Precinct of Seattle.

Cliffe allegedly met a girl online via an adult website, and paid her for a date which became sexual. Cliffe maintained that he thought he was paying a "matchmaking fee" on a dating website for adults. In the encounter, the girl claimed that Cliffe videotaped their encounter "against her will" but that she also "refrained from saying anything." Cliffe denied that he videotaped the encounter.
The girl, then 16, told investigators she communicated with Cliffe via text message. According to police, Cliffe told officers he believed the girl was 23 years old, and the teenager also said she wasn't sure he knew she was 16. To make an account on the website, you must enter that you are at least 18 or older in your profile. The case started in May 2017 when the King County Sheriff's Office received a Child Protective Services referral.

Statement from Cliffe 
On March 6, 2019, and edited in April 2019, Cliffe wrote on Reddit that he "never recorded this person at all" and passed a polygraph test on this subject. He stated that he was not charged with making a recording, and that he had allowed the police to review the contents of his phone in order to show that no recording had been made. He indicated that he entered into an Alford plea to a reduced charge of second degree assault, through which he continued to assert his innocence. He stated that he was offered "work release" as part of his plea deal instead of jail but since he was suspended by Valve had to instead spend "57 days (less than 2 months) in a minimum security facility in Kent, WA" (the Maleng Regional Justice Center) where he helped out unsupervised around the facility. Cliffe also wrote that "despite a good faith effort on my end to do due diligence, I still got catfished—on a dating website for adults where you have to state that you are over 18." He said the evidence showed "that there was never a sexual quid pro quo, and it pointed to me looking for a long term relationship." In addition, he summarized the situation as "very unfortunate" and warned others to "be very careful with people you meet over the internet, always ask for an ID no matter what, trust but verify, watch out for scammers."

References

Bibliography
Vargas, Jose Antonio (2005). "Big Games Hunter." The Washington Post. October 25.
Wallis, Alistair (2007). "Is Modding Useful?" Game Developer. July 1.

1981 births
Living people
American video game designers
Valve Corporation people
Virginia Tech alumni
People from Hunterdon County, New Jersey
People charged with sex crimes
American people convicted of assault